Hematopoietic lineage cell-specific protein is a protein that in humans is encoded by the HCLS1 gene.

Interactions
HCLS1 has been shown to interact with Caspase 3.

References

Further reading